Mediumfjellet is a mountain northwest of Yoldiabukta in Oscar II Land at Spitsbergen, Svalbard. The highest peak is Gavltinden to the north. The mountain is located between the glaciers Sveabreen and Wahlenbergbreen.

References

Mountains of Spitsbergen